The Team event competition at the 2017 World Championships was held on 18 July 2017.

Results
The final was started at 18:30.

References

Team event
World Aquatics Championships